José Barroso Pimentel (born October 16, 1953) is a Brazilian banker and politician. He has represented Ceará in the Federal Senate since 2011. Previously, he was a deputy from Ceará from 1995 to 2011. He is a member of the Workers' Party.

References

Living people
1953 births
Members of the Federal Senate (Brazil)
Workers' Party (Brazil) politicians
Members of the Chamber of Deputies (Brazil) from Ceará
People from Piauí
Brazilian bankers